Deh Sheykh (also Romanized as Deh Sheikh) is a village in Sigar Rural District, in the Central District of Lamerd County, Fars Province, Iran. At the 2006 census, its population was 1,036, in 212 families.

References 

Populated places in Lamerd County